Akinola James Ayodele (born September 17, 1979) is a former American football linebacker in the National Football League (NFL) for the Jacksonville Jaguars, Dallas Cowboys, Miami Dolphins, and Buffalo Bills. He was drafted by the Jacksonville Jaguars in the third round of the 2002 NFL Draft. He played college football at Purdue.

Early years
Ayodele attended MacArthur High School in Irving, Texas. As a senior, he was a two-way player at linebacker and tight end. He tallied 35 tackles, 5 sacks and 8 receptions for 242 yards, while receiving All-District honors.

Although he had good grades in high school, he was missing a course to be able to accept the scholarship from Purdue University, so he enrolled at Coffeyville Community College for one year. As a redshirt freshman, he was switched to defensive end, registering 101 tackles, 7 sacks, 3 forced fumbles and 3 fumble recoveries. He received second-team NJCAA All-American, All-Jayhawk and Mission Conference Defensive Player of the Year honors. At the time, he ranked second on the school all-time tackles for loss in a single-season (33).

As a sophomore, he transferred to Purdue University. He started all of the games at right defensive end, collecting 64 tackles (19 for loss), 11 sacks (fourth in school history), one pass defensed, one forced fumble and one fumble recovery.

As a junior, he started the first 5 games at strongside linebacker and the last 7 at right defensive end. He registered 66 tackles (15 for loss), 9 sacks (tied for second in the Big Ten), 2 interceptions (second on the team), 6 passes defensed (tied for third on the team) and 2 fumble recoveries.

As a senior, he started all of the games at strongside linebacker. He posted 64 tackles, 9 sacks (second in the conference), 20 tackles for loss (sixth in school history), 4 passes defensed, 3 forced fumbles and 2 fumble recoveries. He had 11 tackles (6 for loss), 2 sacks and one pass defensed against the University of Cincinnati. He received the Jimmy Rogers Jr. Most Valuable Lineman trophy at the 2001 Sun Bowl.

He was named first-team All-Big Ten Conference as a senior and second-team All-Conference as a sophomore and junior. He was tied with Jeff Zgonina for second on Purdue's career-record list with 29 sacks, topped only by Rosevelt Colvin with 33. He finished his college career with 194 tackles, 54 tackles for loss (fourth in school history), 2 interceptions, 11 passes defensed, 4 forced fumbles and 5 fumble recoveries.

Professional career

Jacksonville Jaguars
Ayodele was selected in the third round (89th overall) of the 2002 NFL Draft by the Jacksonville Jaguars, with the intention of playing him at outside linebacker. As a rookie, he had 3 starts at strongside linebacker because of injury to Eric Westmoreland and also saw considerable time as a rush end on passing downs. He registered 108 tackles (fourth on team), 3 sacks, 13 quarterback pressures (led the team), 3 passes defensed, one interception, 2 forced fumbles and 13 special teams tackles (tied for second on the team). He had 10 tackles, one sack and one interception against the Cleveland Browns. 

In 2003, he was named a starter at outside linebacker, while posting 150 tackles (second on the team), one sack, 4 passes defensed, 2 interceptions and 3 fumble recoveries. He had  11 tackles, one sack, one quarterback pressure and one interception in the season opener against the Carolina Panthers.

In 2004, he totaled 131 tackles (second on the team), 2 sacks, 3 passes defensed, one forced fumble, one fumble recovery and one blocked field goal. In 2005, he tallied 100 tackles (third on the team) 2.5 sacks, 4 tackles for loss and 4 forced fumbles (led the team). He had 15 tackles and 2 sacks against the Kansas City Chiefs.

Ayodele never missed a game and was the first player in franchise history to record at least 100 tackles in four consecutive seasons.

Dallas Cowboys
In 2006, he signed a five-year contract with the Dallas Cowboys as a free agent, to play inside linebacker in the team's 3-4 defense and help shore up their run defense. Coincidentally, as a child growing up in Irving, Ayodele was a ball boy for the Cowboys in high school. He recorded 106 tackles (second on the team), 5 tackles for loss (tied for the team lead), 2 interceptions (third on the team), 4 passes defensed, 2 fumble recoveries and 7 special teams tackles. He started in the NFC Wild Card Playoff Game against the Seattle Seahawks, making 8 tackles.

In 2007, Ayodele had a chance to play on the same team with his brother Remi, while posting 14 starts, 95 tackles (fourth on the team), 4 passes defensed and 3 special teams tackles. He started in the NFC Divisional Playoff Game against the New York Giants, making 6 tackles.

In 2008, after the team signed free agent linebacker Zach Thomas, he became tradable. On April 25, Ayodele was traded along with tight end Anthony Fasano to the Miami Dolphins in exchange for a fourth-round pick (#100-Tyvon Branch) in the 2008 NFL Draft.

Miami Dolphins
In 2008, he reunited with former Cowboys head coach Bill Parcells, who was the team's Executive Vice President of Football Operations with the Miami Dolphins. He tallied 13 starts, 74 tackles (third on the team), 2 interceptions, 4 passes defensed and one fumble recovery. He started in the AFC wild card game against the Baltimore Ravens, tying for a team-high 6 tackles and having one pass defensed.

In 2009, he started in 15 games, recording 70 tackles (third on the team), one forced fumble and 2 fumble recoveries. He had 8 tackles against the Houston Texans. On March 5, 2010, he was released, as he was seen as a liability in pass coverage. Enters the 2010 season having recorded at least one tackle in 71 consecutive games.

Denver Broncos
On April 24, 2010, Ayodele signed with the Denver Broncos. He was assigned the jersey number 51 and was released on August 24.

Buffalo Bills
On September 10, 2010, the Buffalo Bills signed Ayodele to take the spot of LB Kawika Mitchell after the team placed him on the injured reserve list. He appeared in 15 games (10 starts), missing the first game of his professional career. He wasn't re-signed at the end of the season.

Personal life
"Akin" is a short name for "Akinola", which in Yoruba language means 'the brave and wealthy one'. His younger brother Remi Ayodele played defensive tackle in the NFL. Ayodele was inducted into the Irving Independent School District first Hall of Fame Class in 2012.

References

External links

Official website
Coffeyville Red Ravens bio

1979 births
Living people
Nigerian players of American football
People from Irving, Texas
Players of American football from Dallas
American sportspeople of Nigerian descent
American people of Yoruba descent
Yoruba sportspeople
American football defensive ends
American football linebackers
Coffeyville Red Ravens football players
Purdue Boilermakers football players
Jacksonville Jaguars players
Dallas Cowboys players
Miami Dolphins players
Buffalo Bills players